Peder Østlund (7 May 1872 – 22 January 1939) was a Norwegian speed skater.

Peder Østlund held the first position on the Adelskalender ranking during two periods, for a total of almost 10 years (3,644 days). He became World Allround Champion in 1898 and 1899 and European Allround Champion in 1899 and 1900. He was Norwegian Allround Champion in 1898.

Østlund held world records ten times throughout his career. In Davos on the weekend of 10–11 February 1900 he set four of them.

Østlund represented the club Trondhjems Skøiteklub.

Records

Personal bests
500 m - 45.2
1,000 m - 1;34.0
1,500 m - 2:22.6
3,000 m - 6:56.4
5,000 m - 8:51.8
10,000 m - 17:50.6

World records 

Source: SpeedSkatingStats.com

References

1872 births
1939 deaths
World record setters in speed skating
Norwegian male speed skaters
World Allround Speed Skating Championships medalists
Sportspeople from Trondheim